Cecelia Helen Goetz (September 30, 1917January 26, 2004) was an American lawyer and bankruptcy judge who served as a prosecutor at the Nuremberg trials.

Early life 
Goetz graduated from Textile High School in Chelsea, where she was editor-in-chief of the school paper. Goetz earned her law degree from New York University School of Law where she served as editor-in-chief of the New York University Law Review—the first woman named editor-in-chief of a major American law journal—and graduated as salutatorian in 1940. While in law school, she studied abroad at the Sorbonne. As of her graduation in 1940, she lived at 2015 Avenue I in Brooklyn.

Nuremberg 

After initially being rebuffed, Goetz took a job at the Department of Justice in the equivalent of today's Civil Division. She applied to serve as a Nuremberg prosecutor, was rebuffed again at the instance of the Department of War, but was eventually given a "waiver of disability" by Telford Taylor so she could serve. The "disability" was her gender. She had been offered a supervisor's role at Justice—the first woman to be given such an opportunity—but declined it in favor of work at Nuremberg.

She was first involved in the Flick Trial and then became Associate Counsel on the trial of Alfred Krupp, delivering the opening statement on December 8, 1947. She was one of four women on the Nuremberg prosecution team and, as Associate Counsel, she outranked six men. At the time, she observed that "[t]o get a decision in this case would, in my opinion, be a great step toward avoiding future wars." She would later describe her participation in the trials as "the most important work I have ever been involved in."

Private practice and government 
After Nuremberg, Goetz returned to the United States. She worked at her father Isidor Goetz's firm, Goetz & Goetz, and later became the first woman to serve as Assistant Chief Counsel to the Economic Stabilization Agency. She was later Special Assistant to the Attorney General in the Tax Division of the Department of Justice. In 1964, she was admitted to the partnership at Herzfeld & Rubin, a New York law firm.

Judicial career 
Goetz was appointed a United States Bankruptcy Judge in 1978, becoming the first woman to serve as Bankruptcy Judge in New York's Eastern District. Her chambers were in Happauge, New York. In the early 1990s, Goetz oversaw the bankruptcy proceedings of Braniff International Airways, which had filed under Chapter 11 in August 1991. She served until 1993, returning to Herzfeld & Rubin thereafter.

Works

Notes

Sources

Further reading 
  Chapter 25 provides a detailed account of the Krupp trial and Goetz's role in it.

External links 
 
 Brief of the prosecution in the Krupp trial

1917 births
2004 deaths
Judges of the United States bankruptcy courts
Lawyers from New York City
New York University School of Law alumni
Nuremberg trials
Paris-Sorbonne University alumni
People from Chelsea, Manhattan
20th-century American judges
20th-century American lawyers